Ishar is a series of three role-playing computer games by Silmarils.

Ishar may also refer to:

 Ishar Bindra (born 1921), Indian American investor, entrepreneur and philanthropist
 Ishar Singh (1895–1963), Indian soldier and Victoria Cross recipient 
 Ishar Singh (poet) (1892–1966), Punjabi satirical poet
 Ishar Singh (Sikh prince) (1802–1804), prince of the Sikh Empire
 Ishar Singh Marhana (1878–1941), Indian activist and revolutionary
 Ishtup-Ishar, king of the second Mariote kingdom who reigned c. 2400 BC

See also
 Ishara (disambiguation)
 Ishtar (disambiguation)